Roger Federer was the defending champion, but chose not to participate this year.

Gaël Monfils won the title, defeating Stan Wawrinka in the final, 6–3, 1–6, 6–2. This was Wawrinka's first final in any ATP Tour event since the 2017 French Open.

Seeds

Draw

Finals

Top half

Bottom half

Qualifying

Seeds

Qualifiers

Lucky losers

Qualifying draw

First qualifier

Second qualifier

Third qualifier

Fourth qualifier

References

External links
 Main draw
 Qualifying draw

Singles